Tyrone Orville Lund (March 31, 1938 – February 28, 2021) was a Canadian politician who served as Member of the Legislative Assembly of Alberta, representing the constituency of Rocky Mountain House (now Rimbey-Rocky Mountain House-Sundre) as a Progressive Conservative until his defeat in 2012.

Early life
Lund was born on March 31, 1938, in Rocky Mountain House, Alberta. He was a third-generation farmer.

Political career
Prior to entering provincial politics, Lund was involved in municipal government. He served as a municipal councillor of the Municipal District of Clearwater for nine years, beginning in 1980. For the last four of those years, Lund was reeve. He was also a member of the provincial executive of the Alberta Association of Municipal Districts and Counties from 1987 to 1989.

Lund was first elected as a Member of the Legislature in 1989, with 60 per cent of the vote in the constituency. During his past five terms, Lund has held many positions, including five ministerial portfolios. He was first appointed Minister of Environmental Protection in 1994, and re-appointed in 1997. In 1999, Lund became Minister of Alberta Agriculture, Food and Rural Development. He was then appointed Minister of Infrastructure in 2001. In 2004, he became Minister of Government Services. Lund held that position until April 2006, when he was appointed Minister of Infrastructure and Transportation, which  he held until December 2006.

Lund was elected to his sixth term representing the constituency of Rocky Mountain House in the 2008 provincial election, where he received 62 per cent of the votes. He was the chair of the Regulatory Secretariat and deputy chair of the Legislative Offices Committee and Select Special Information and Privacy Commissioner Search Committee.  He was also a member of the Alaska/Alberta Bilateral Council, the Council of State Governments–West: Trade and Transportation, and the Standing Committee on Energy.

Personal life
Lund was active in his community. He was the coordinator of the Civil Air Rescue Emergency Services (Canadian Air Rescue) and treasurer of the Immanuel Evangelical Lutheran Church's parish. Lund was also a member of the Rocky Mountain House Agricultural Society, as well as of local chapters of the 4-H Club, the Kinsmen Club and the Rotary Club. He died on February 28, 2021, at the age of 82 in Rimbey, Alberta.

Election results

References

External links

1938 births
2021 deaths
Progressive Conservative Association of Alberta MLAs
Members of the Executive Council of Alberta
21st-century Canadian politicians